Sir William Harris (21 September 1556 – 14 November 1616) was an English knight, land owner, and a notable incorporator in the third Virginia Company of London.

The village of Cricksea (or Creeksea) exists today on this peninsula in Essex County. Anciently called "Danes Island", this area was inhabited largely by Norman families after the conquest in 1066.

Sir William Harris was knighted on 23 July 1603 at Whitehall on the eve of the coronation of James I. His elevation to the knighthood was the result of military service in Ireland during the Nine Years' War along with his cousin Sir William Harris of Shenfield, Essex.

Family life
William Harris was born on 21 September 1556 in Essex. His parents were Sir Arthur Harris and Dorothy Waldegrave. He made his home at Creeksea Place Manor

William married Alice Smythe on 6 May 1583 in St Gabriel Fenchurch, London, England. Alice was the daughter of Thomas Smythe of Westenhanger, Kent.

The children of Sir William Harris and Lady Alice Harris were:
 
Sir Arthur Harris b 1584....d 9 Jan 1632
William Harris b 1585....d 1622 in Lincolns Inn, Middlesex.
Thomas Harris b 1586....d 1617 in England, unmarried and without issue
John Harris b 1588....d by 14 Oct 1638 in Charles City Co., Va.
Alice Harris married Sir Henry Mildmay
Frances Harris married Mr. Roope
Elizabeth Harris
Mary Harris married Gyles Browne

Virginia Company

Sir William Harris, his brother in law, Sir Thomas Smythe and his son, Sir Arthur Harris, each, were Incorporators and Subscribers to the third charter of the Virginia Company of London, and each paid £75 as their subscription. Both Harris and Smythe were very interested in the development of Virginia.  They exerted their influence to secure money, men, equipment, supplies, and ships for the colonization efforts.

Lady Alice died 10 November 1615 and Sir William on 14 November 1616. Both are buried at All Saints' Church in Creeksea. All Saints still displays a depiction of Sir William and his sword, a rapier, which was found in Creeksea Place and given to the church.

Sources

The Virginia Company of London, 1606-1624, by Wesley Frank Craven, published by University Press of Virginia, 1957, Charlottesville, Virginia.

References

1556 births
1616 deaths
16th-century English people
17th-century English people
English knights
People from Maldon District